Next is a short film created by Aardman Animations. Its full title is "Next: The Infinite Variety Show."

Plot
William Shakespeare auditions for an undetermined role in front of a bored Peter Hall with references to his play in under five minutes.

Cast
Barry Purves - Will, a poor player (animation)
Roger Rees - Peter, a Producer (voice)

Production
The film was commissioned by Channel 4 as part of a 5-part series of Aardman animations called "Lip Synch": Creature Comforts (1989), Going Equipped (1990), Ident (1990), Next (1990) and War Story (1989).

Peter was voiced by Roger Rees and is reading one of Hall's books. The halo indicates that he represents Saint Peter, and that Shakespeare is auditioning to get into Heaven. The film references all of 37 Shakespeare plays.

A clip of this short was shown in the 2003 documentary Animated Century.

Critical reception
On imdb, Next received a rating of 7.3/10 from 188 users.

References

External links
Next on IMDB
Excerpt on Vimeo
Next on YouTube

1990 animated films
1990s animated short films
Films based on works by William Shakespeare
1990 short films
1990 films
British animated short films
1990s English-language films
1990s British films